Edward Lee (born May 25, 1957) is an American novelist specializing in the field of horror who has written 40 books, more than half of which have been published by mass-market New York City paperback companies such as Leisure/Dorchester, Berkley, and Zebra/Kensington. He is a Bram Stoker award nominee for his story “Mr. Torso,” and his short stories have appeared in over a dozen mass-market anthologies, including the award-winning “999”. Several of his novels have sold translation rights to Germany, Greece, Romania, and Poland. He also publishes quite actively in the small-press/limited-edition hardcover market; many of his books in this category have become collector's items.

Life and career
Lee is particularly known for over-the-top occult concepts and an accelerated treatment of erotic and/or morbid sexual imagery and visceral violence.  He was born on May 25, 1957 in Washington, D.C., and grew up in Bowie, Maryland.  In the late-70s he served in the U.S. Army's 1st Armored Division, in Erlangen, West Germany, then, for a short time, was a municipal police officer in Cottage City, Maryland.  Lee also attended the University of Maryland as an English major but quit in his last semester to pursue his dream of being a horror novelist.  For over 15 years, he worked as the night manager for a security company in Annapolis, Maryland, while writing in his spare time.  In 1997, however, he became a full-time writer, first spending several years in Seattle and then moving to Largo, Florida, where he currently resides.

Lee cites as his strongest influence horror legend H. P. Lovecraft; in 2007, Lee embarked on what he calls his “Lovecraft kick” and wrote a spate of novels and novellas which tribute Lovecraft and his famous Cthulhu Mythos.  Among these projects are Trolley No. 1852, Pages Torn From A Travel Journal, Haunter Of The Threshold, The Innswich Horror, Lucifer's Lottery, and The Dunwich Romance.

Bibliography

Novels
 Night Bait (1982) (written under the pseudonym Philip Straker)
 Night Lust (1982) (written under the pseudonym Philip Straker)
 Ghouls (1988)
 Coven (1991)
 Incubi (1991)
 Succubi (1992)
 The Chosen (1993)
 Creekers (1994)
 Sacrifice (1995) (written under the pseudonym Richard Kinion)
 Header (1995)
 Goon (1996) with John Pelan
 The Bighead (1997)
 Shifters (1998) with John Pelan
 Portrait of the Psychopath as a Young Woman (1998) with Elizabeth Steffen
 Splatterspunk: The Micah Hays Stories (1998) with John Pelan
 Masks (1999)
 Operator B (1999)
 Dahmer’s Not Dead with Elizabeth Steffen (1999)
 The Stickmen (1999)
 The Deaths of the Cold War Kings: The Assassinations of Diem & JFK with Bradley O'Leary (2000)
 City Infernal (2001): Cemetery Dance Publications.
 Mr. Torso (2002)
 Sex, Drugs and Power Tools (2002)
 Family Tradition (2002) with John Pelan
 Monstrosity (2002): Cemetery Dance Publications.
 Ever Nat (2003)
 The Baby (2003)
 Teratologist (2003) with Wrath James White
 Incubi (2003): Necro Publications.
 Infernal Angel (2003): Cemetery Dance Publications. Published as a 26-copy leather-bound hardcover and 750-copy limited hardcover.
 (January 2004): Leisure Books. Published as a Mass Market Paperback.
 Messenger (August 2004): Leisure Books. Published as a Mass Market Paperback.
 The Backwoods (October 2005): Leisure Books. Published as a Mass Market Paperback.
 (December 2005): Cemetery Dance Publications. Published as a 52-copy leather-bound hardcover and 750-copy limited hardcover.
 Monster Lake (2005). Necro Publications. First book for young readers.
 Flesh Gothic (February 2005): Leisure Books. Published as a Mass Market Paperback.
 Slither (2006: Necro Publications.)
 Gast (2007)
 (October 2009): Leisure Books. Revised, retitled Black Train, and published as a Mass Market Paperback.
 House Infernal (October 2007): Leisure Books. Published as a Mass Market Paperback.
 (February 2008): Cemetery Dance Publications. Published as a 26-copy leather-bound hardcover and 1000-copy limited hardcover.
 Minotauress (December 2008): Necro Publications. Published as a 26-copy leather-bound hardcover and 300-copy limited hardcover.
 Brides of the Impaler (September 2008): Leisure Books. Published as a Mass Market Paperback.
 (May 2011): Cemetery Dance Publications. Published as Hardcover Limited Edition of 1000 signed copies bound in full cloth and Smyth sewn and Traycased Hardcover Lettered Edition of 52 signed and lettered copies bound in leather with a satin ribbon page marker.
 Golemesque (March 2009): Necro Publications. Published as a 26-copy leather-bound hardcover and 300-copy limited hardcover.
 (April 2009): Leisure Books. Published as Golem as a Mass Market Paperback.
 Trolley No. 1852 (May 2009): Bloodletting Press. Published as a 26-copy leather-bound hardcover and 300-copy limited hardcover.(October 2010) Deadite Press, Trade Paperback.
 The Haunter of the Threshold (Summer 2009) Bloodletting Press.  Limited-edition. (December 2010) Deadite Press, Trade Paperback.
 City of Sixes (2009) Necro Publications. Exclusive limited-edition chapbook included with copies of Infernally Yours.
 You are My Everything (January 2010) Necro Publications.
 Going Monstering (January 2010) Bloodletting Press.  Exclusive limited-edition.
 Header 2 (June 2010) Camelot Books.  Exclusive limited-edition.
 The Innswich Horror (Summer 2010) Cemetery Dance.  Limited edition (July 2010), Deadite Press Trade paperback, (2012) digital Necro Publications.
 Lucifers Lottery (October 2010) Dorchester, eBook.  (July 2011) trade paperback.
 Pages Torn From a Travel Journal (January 31, 2011) Bloodletting Press.
 Vampire Lodge (January, 2011) Necro Publications. E-Book only (second book for young readers)
 Witch Water (Spring 2011) Bloodletting Press. Limited edition hardcover. (Feb. 2012) Dorchester. Paperback/eBook
 The Dunwich Romance (2011)
 The Doll House (2017)
 Header 3 (2017) with Ryan Harding; Bloodletting Press. Limited edition
 White Trash Gothic (2017)
 White Trash Gothic 2 (2019)
 In the Year of Our Lord: 2202 (2019)
 White Trash Gothic III (2020)
 The Television (2022)

Collections
 The Ushers (1999)
 Of Pigs and Spiders (1999) with John Pelan, Brett Alexander Savory and David Niall Wilson
 Partners in Chyme (2001) with Ryan Harding
 Sleep Disorder (2003) with Jack Ketchum
 Haunted House (2007)
 Brain Cheese Buffet (2010) Deadite Press
 Bullet Through Your Face (2010) Deadite Press
 Carnal Surgery (April 2011) Deadite Press
 Mangled Meat, (July 2011) Deadite Press

Anthologies
 Infernally Yours (2009) "The Senery" by Edward Lee Necro Publications, a limited-edition hardcover.
 Dark Seductions: Tales of Erotic Horror (1993) "Private Pleasures" by Edward Lee
 Bizarre Sex and Other Crimes of Passion (1994) "I"d Give Anything for You" by Edward Lee & Jack Ketchum
 Deadly After Dark: The Hot Blood Series (1994) "Mr. Torso" by Edward Lee
 Seeds of Fear: The Hot Blood Series (1995) "Grub Girl" by Edward Lee
 Stranger By Night: The Hot Blood Series (1995) "Dead Girls in Love" by Edward Lee & Gary Bowen
 Darkside: Horror for the Next Millennium (1996) "The Stick Woman" by Edward Lee
 Fear the Fever: The Hot Blood Series (1996) "Love Letters from the Rain Forest" by Jack Ketchum & Edward Lee
 White House Horrors (1996) "Night of the Vegetables" by Edward Lee
 The UFO Files (1997) "Secret Service" by Edward Lee
 Inside The Works (1997) "The Pig" by Edward Lee
 Whitley Strieber"s Aliens (1998) "Scripture Girl" by Edward Lee
 999 (1999) "ICU" by Edward Lee
 Graven Images (2000) "Masks" by Jack Ketchum & Edward Lee
 Triage (2001) "In the Year of Our Lord 2202" by Edward Lee
 Excitable Boys (2002) "The McCrath Model SS40-C, Series S" by Edward Lee
 Damned: An Anthology of the Lost (2004) "Angel" by Edward Lee
 Small Bites (2004) "The Room" by Edward Lee

Movies
Edward Lee's story "Header" has been made into the film Header. Edward Lee and Jack Ketchum are featured in cameo roles in the movie.

"Grub Girl" was made into a film in 2006.

References

External links

 Official Website (last updated 2011)

Interviews
 Fangoria, April, 2004, issue 231
 Buried
 Meat Socket
 Severed Cinema
 Bloody Disgusting
 More Meat Socket

20th-century American novelists
21st-century American novelists
American horror writers
American male novelists
Living people
1957 births
Splatterpunk
20th-century American male writers
21st-century American male writers
20th-century pseudonymous writers
21st-century pseudonymous writers